The True State of the Affairs (Pravo stanje stvari) is a 1964 Yugoslav drama film directed by Vladan Slijepčević.

Plot
A young engineer Zoran Javkovljević (Miloš Žutić) is serving in the Yugoslav People's Army while his spouse Branka (Branka Zorić) is having an affair with another man. Upon returning, he finds out about her romantic entanglement and decides to return the favour.

Sources
 Pravo stanje stvari - Filmski klub

External links
 

1964 films
Serbian drama films
Yugoslav drama films
Jadran Film films
Films set in Belgrade
Films shot in Belgrade